Khel Paheliyon Ka is an Indian interactive quiz show currently hosted by Ssumier Pasricha, known for his character 'Pammi Aunty'. It is an original series of Flipkart Video directed by Manu Prakash Singh and produced under the banner of Indian Storytellers. The concept is devised by Charul Prabhakar. The show was launched on Flipkart app on 2 June 2021.

Overview 
Khel Paheliyon Ka is a daily game show where home viewers are the contestants. Each episode will be 4–6 minutes in length and feature three riddles that the viewers have to solve with the help of clues and hints provided by the host. The show will cover themes ranging from fashion, sports, music, Bollywood to famous personalities. In every question, the viewers will see the answer in a form of Anagram. The viewers have to crack the clues within 30 seconds and rearrange the alphabets to submit the correct answer.

Development 
On 31 March 2021, Flipkart Video announced the release date as 2 June 2021 on its official Twitter. This was followed by a 36-second trailer featuring Prince Narula, which was unveiled on the YouTube channel.

References

External links 

 
 

2021 web series debuts
Hindi-language web series
Indian game shows
Quiz shows